The Loing is a  long river in central France, a left tributary of the Seine.

Its source is in Sainte-Colombe-sur-Loing, in the southwestern  of the department of Yonne, and it flows into the Seine in Saint-Mammès, near Moret-sur-Loing.
Its main tributaries are the Ouanne, the Aveyron, the Puiseaux, the Solin, the Lunain and the Orvanne.
The part of the Briare Canal between Rogny-les-Sept-Écluses and Montargis runs parallel to the Loing.

Departments and communes along river course 

Yonne: Sainte-Colombe-sur-Loing, Saint-Sauveur-en-Puisaye, Moutiers-en-Puisaye, Saint-Fargeau, Saint-Martin-des-Champs, Saint-Privé, Bléneau, Rogny-les-Sept-Écluses
Loiret: Dammarie-sur-Loing, Sainte-Geneviève-des-Bois, Châtillon-Coligny, Montbouy, Montcresson, Conflans-sur-Loing, Amilly, Montargis, Châlette-sur-Loing, Cepoy, Girolles, Fontenay-sur-Loing, Nargis, Dordives
Seine-et-Marne: Château-Landon, Souppes-sur-Loing, La Madeleine-sur-Loing, Poligny, Bagneaux-sur-Loing, Saint-Pierre-lès-Nemours, Nemours, Montcourt-Fromonville, Grez-sur-Loing, Bourron-Marlotte, Montigny-sur-Loing, La Genevraye, Épisy, Écuelles, Moret-sur-Loing, Saint-Mammès, Veneux-les-Sablons

Tributaries
Left tributaries: Solin, Puiseaux, Beaune
Right tributaries: Orvanne, Lunain, Ouanne, Aveyron

References

Rivers of France
Rivers of Bourgogne-Franche-Comté
Rivers of Centre-Val de Loire
Rivers of Île-de-France
Rivers of Yonne
Rivers of Loiret
Rivers of Seine-et-Marne